John E. Searl (July 7, 1921 – April 29, 1991) was an American actor. He portrayed bratty kids in several films, and often had only small roles, such as "Robin Figg" in 1934's Strictly Dynamite.

Early years
His name is sometimes written as Jackie Searle, and by 1960, he was billed as Jack Searl. As a child actor, he began performing on a local Los Angeles radio station at the age of three.

Military service
Searl served four years in the U.S. Army, primarily as a radio instructor, during World War II.

Career

His first movie role was in Daughters of Desire (1929), followed by Tom Sawyer (1930) with Jackie Coogan and Mitzi Green, and Huckleberry Finn in 1931.

Notable films in which he appeared include Skippy, High Gear, Peck's Bad Boy, Great Expectations, and Little Lord Fauntleroy. In the 1940s, he had some supporting character roles before disappearing for nearly a decade. In the early 1960s, Searl enjoyed a flurry of activity as a supporting villain on television.  For example, he appeared in the Perry Mason episode "The Case of the Traveling Treasure," first aired on CBS on Nov. 4, 1961. Credited as Jack Searl, he appeared in 1962 as Slick - Henchman on the TV western Lawman in the episode titled "The Tarnished Badge" and in 1965 as Henden in the episode "Much A Glue About Nothing" of the situation comedy The Cara Williams Show.

Partial filmography

References

Bibliography
 Holmstrom, John. The Moving Picture Boy: An International Encyclopaedia from 1895 to 1995, Norwich, Michael Russell, 1996, pp. 98–99.
 Dye, David. Child and Youth Actors: Filmography of Their Entire Careers, 1914-1985. Jefferson, NC: McFarland & Co., 1988, pp. 210–211.
 Best, Marc. Those Endearing Young Charms: Child Performers of the Screen. South Brunswick and New York: Barnes & Co., 1971, pp. 230–234.
 Willson, Dixie. Little Hollywood Stars. Akron, OH, e New York: Saalfield Pub. Co., 1935.

External links
 

1921 births
1991 deaths
American male film actors
American male silent film actors
American male television actors
American male child actors
Male actors from Los Angeles
Military personnel from California
20th-century American male actors
United States Army personnel of World War II